Sydney Football Club is an Australian women's football club based in Sydney, New South Wales, Australia. It competes in the A-League Women, the top tier of women's football in Australia.

History

Establishment

The formation of the W-League in October 2008 saw the league composed of eight teams. Seven of the eight clubs were directly affiliated with the A-League clubs, Sydney FC being one. The women's team shares the men's club name and colours.

Inaugural season

The inaugural W-League season was played over 10 rounds, followed by a finals series. During Sydney's season opener, the squad defeated Perth Glory 4–0 with a brace scored by Leena Khamis and two goals from Danielle Small and Heather Garriock.

Captained by Australian international Heather Garriock Sydney's first season saw mixed results. The club made it to the top four to qualify for the finals, however lost out to eventual champions Brisbane in the semi-finals.

Kits

The primary club colour of Sydney FC is sky blue, which represents the state colour of New South Wales. The secondary club colour is navy blue, with additional contrasting colours of white.

The former Sydney FC badge was created and used since the men's club founding in 2004. It features a football set centrally in a stylised crest shape.  Above the ball is the shape of three shells of the Sydney Opera House, an internationally recognisable symbol of the city of Sydney.  Below the ball is the Commonwealth Star, a seven-pointed star symbolising the Federation of Australia.

The current Sydney FC badge was released in 2017. The crest features the Sydney Opera House in white pictured in front of a sky-blue backdrop on top of a navy blue base featuring the Commonwealth Star.

Kit suppliers and shirt sponsors

Stadiums

Sydney FC currently plays its home games at WIN Stadium, Jubilee Oval, ANZ Stadium, and  Allianz Stadium (formerly Sydney Football Stadium). Located in Wollongong, New South Wales, WIN Stadium features a seating capacity of 23,750 and a grass field. Jubilee Oval is located in Carlton, New South Wales, a suburb of Sydney. It features a 24,000 seating capacity and grass pitch. The primary tenants for both fields are the St. George Illawarra Dragons rugby league team. ANZ Stadium has a capacity of 82,500, and is only a secondary home for bigger matches, such as the Sydney Derby against Western Sydney Wanderers. Allianz Stadium is located in Moore Park, Sydney and features a seating capacity of 41,159 and grass pitch. The Matildas, Socceroos and the Wallabies occasionally play at the stadium, while the Sydney Roosters, NSW Waratahs and Sydney FC men's team are the grounds major tenants.

During the inaugural season of the W-League, Sydney FC played their home matches at Campbelltown Stadium, a rugby league stadium in Leumeah, New South Wales, Australia. The stadium is owned by Campbelltown City Council and features a nominal capacity of 20,000. It is the full-time home ground for the Western Suburbs Magpies District Rugby league Football Club and is one of three home grounds for the Wests Tigers Rugby league Football Club. The men's Sydney FC team played some pre-season and A-League matches at the stadium in 2008 as well.

During the 2009 season, the club played their home games at Sydney Football Stadium. The following season, they played home games at Campbelltown Stadium, WIN Stadium, and Seymour Shaw Park. During the 2011–12 season, they played at Leichhardt Oval and Campbelltown Stadium. During the 2012–13 season, they played at Leichhardt Oval, Sydney Football Stadium, and Cromer Park. During the 2013–2014 season, they played at Jubilee Oval, WIN Stadium, the SFS and at the Sydney United Sports Centre.

During the 2014/15 season, they played their home games at Lambert Park, Jubilee Oval and WIN Stadium.

Players

Current squad

Management

Current staff

Managerial history

Season by season record 

Notes

Honours
W-League/A-League Women regular season
Premiers (4): 2009, 2010–11, 2020–21, 2021-22,
Runners-up: 2013–14, 2017–18, 2021-22,
W-League/A-League Women finals
Champions (3): 2009, 2012–13, 2018–19
Runners-up: 2010–11, 2015–16, 2017–18, 2019–20, 2020–21, 2021–22

See also
 List of top-division football clubs in AFC countries
 Women's soccer in Australia
 W-League (Australia) all-time records
 Australia women's national soccer team

References

External links
 

 
Sydney FC
A-League Women teams
Women's soccer clubs in Australia
2008 establishments in Australia

Sydney FC